"Where the Green Grass Grows" is a song written by Jess Leary and Craig Wiseman, and recorded by American country music artist Tim McGraw. It was released on July 13, 1998 as the fifth single from McGraw's Everywhere album.  The song reached number one on the Billboard Hot Country Singles & Tracks (now Hot Country Songs) chart and peaked at number seventy-nine on the Hot 100.  It also reached number one on the Canadian RPM Country Tracks chart.

Content
The song tells the story of a man leaving the big city by going back out into the country.

The song is referenced and sampled in McGraw's 2021 single, "7500 OBO".

Critical reception
Kevin John Coyne of Country Universe gave the song an A grade, saying it is "tightly produced, with an instantly recognizable opening fiddle." He went on to say that the lyrics are "cleverly constructed" and "brilliantly contrasted."

Chart performance

Year-end charts

Certifications

Parodies
American country music parody artist Cledus T. Judd released a parody of "Where the Green Grass Grows" titled "Where the Grass Don't Grow" on his 1999 album Juddmental.

References

1998 singles
1997 songs
Tim McGraw songs
Songs written by Craig Wiseman
Song recordings produced by Byron Gallimore
Song recordings produced by Tim McGraw
Song recordings produced by James Stroud
Curb Records singles
Songs about farmers